George Tonali's Dreams is a book written by Antonio Cecere, based on the award winning novel I Sogni di George. This book portrays eleven searchers on the path of self-discovery. Artists, madmen, women who betrayed and fugitives are the passengers on La Nave Dei Sogni who explore each other's imaginations and expectations through surrealism, dreams, philosophy and humour.

Overview
Everything is seen through the eyes and dreams of writer George Tonali, whose search for “the point” takes him to places where a dream maker is killed in a riot, a woman with a quill writes her story on a naked man and yellow peppers are hung to dry like clean laundry.

In a constantly shifting focus, the background becomes the foreground, and each character evolves independently into an indispensable piece of the puzzle.

A language echoing in intensity, yet unique for its simplicity. George and his dreams, in search of ‘the point’, around which everything moves and acts. A central idea putting him [the writer] between Calvino and Eco. I believe a new kind of writer is born, for his geniality of style and deep understanding of human self-discovery. –Carmine di Biase, 2004, Book review.

References

External links
 

2004 novels